The raven banner was a flag, possibly totemic in nature, flown by various Viking chieftains and other Scandinavian rulers during the 9th, 10th and 11th centuries. The flag, as depicted in Norse artwork, was roughly triangular, with a rounded outside edge on which there hung a series of tabs or tassels. It bore a resemblance to ornately carved "weather-vanes" used aboard Viking longships.

Scholars conjecture that the  raven flag was a symbol of Odin, who was often depicted accompanied by two ravens named Huginn and Muninn.  Its intent may have been to strike fear in one's enemies by invoking the power of Odin. As one scholar notes regarding encounters between the Christian Anglo-Saxons and the invading pagan Scandinavians:

Raven symbolism in Norse culture

The raven is a common iconic figure in Norse mythology. The highest god Odin had two ravens named Huginn and Muninn ("thought" and "memory" respectively) who flew around the world bringing back tidings to their master. Therefore, one of Odin's many names was the "raven god" (Hrafnaguð). In Gylfaginning (c. 1220), the medieval Icelandic historian Snorri Sturluson explains:

Odin was also closely linked to ravens because in Norse myths he received the fallen warriors at Valhalla, and ravens were linked with death and war due to their predilection for carrion. It is consequently likely that they were regarded as manifestations of the Valkyries, goddesses who chose the valiant dead for military service in Valhalla.
A further connection between ravens and Valkyries was indicated in the shapeshifting abilities of goddesses and Valkyries, who could appear in the form of birds.

The raven appears in almost every skaldic poem describing warfare. To make war was to feed and please the raven (hrafna seðja, hrafna gleðja). An example of this is found in Norna-Gests þáttr, where Regin recites the following poem after Sigurd kills the sons of Hunding:

Above all, kennings used in Norse poetry identify the raven as the bird of blood, corpses and battle; he is the gull of the wave of the heap of corpses, who screams dashed with hail and craves morning steak as he arrives at the sea of corpses.

In black flocks, the ravens hover over the corpses and the skald asks where they are heading. The raven goes forth in the blood of those fallen in battle. He flies from the field of battle with blood on his beak, human flesh in his talons and the reek of corpses from his mouth.
The ravens who were the messengers of the highest god, Huginn and Muninn, increasingly had hellish connotations, and as early as in the Christian Sólarljóð, stanza 67, the ravens of Hel(l) (heljar hrafnar) who tear the eyes off backtalkers are mentioned. Two curses in the Poetic Edda say "may ravens tear your heart asunder". and "the ravens shall tear out your eyes in the high gallows". Ravens are thus seen as instruments of divine (if harsh and unpleasant) justice.

Despite the violent imagery associated with them, early Scandinavians regarded the raven as a largely positive figure; battle and harsh justice were viewed favorably in Norse culture.<ref>E.g., Woolf 63–81; Poole passim.</ref> Many Old Norse personal names referred to the raven, such as Hrafn, Hrafnkel and Hrafnhild.

Usage
Late 9th century
The raven banner was used by a number of Viking warlords regarded in Norse tradition as the sons of Ragnar Lodbrok. The first mention of a Viking force carrying a raven banner is in the Anglo-Saxon Chronicle. For the year 878, the Chronicle relates:
In the winter of the same year, the brother of Ivar and Halfdan landed in Devonshire, Wessex, with 23 ships, and he was killed there along with 800 other people and 40 of his soldiers. The war banner (guþfana) which they called "Raven" was also taken.
The 12th-century Annals of St Neots claims that a raven banner was present with the Great Heathen Army and adds insight into its seiðr- (witchcraft-) influenced creation and totemic and oracular nature:

Geffrei Gaimar's Estorie des Engles (written around 1140) mentions the Hrafnsmerki being borne by the army of Ubbe at the Battle of Cynwit (878): "[t]he Raven was Ubbe's banner (gumfanun). He was the brother of Iware; he was buried by the vikings in a very big mound in Devonshire, called Ubbelawe."

10th century

In the 10th century, the raven banner seems to have been adopted by Norse-Gaelic kings of  Dublin and Northumbria. Many of the Norse-Gaelic dynasts in Britain and Ireland were of the Uí Ímair clan, which claimed descent from Ragnar Lodbrok through his son Ivar.
A triangular banner appearing to depict a bird (possibly a raven) appears on a penny minted by Olaf Cuaran around 940. The coin features a roughly right isosceles triangular standard, with the two equilateral sides situated at the top and staff, respectively. Along the hypotenuse are a series of five tabs or tassels. The staff is topped by what appears to be a cross; this may indicate a fusion of pagan and Christian symbolism.

The raven banner was also a standard used by the Norse Jarls of Orkney. According to the Orkneyinga Saga, it was made for Sigurd the Stout by his mother, a völva or shamanic seeress. She told him that the banner would "bring victory to the man it's carried before, but death to the one who carries it." The saga describes the flag as "a finely made banner, very cleverly embroidered with the figure of a raven, and when the banner fluttered in the breeze, the raven seemed to be flying ahead." Sigurd's mother's prediction came true when, according to the sagas, all of the bearers of the standard met untimely ends. The "curse" of the banner ultimately fell on Jarl Sigurd himself at the Battle of Clontarf:
Earl Sigurd had a hard battle against Kerthialfad, and Kerthialfad came on so fast that he laid low all who were in the front rank, and he broke the array of Earl Sigurd right up to his banner, and slew the banner-bearer. Then he got another man to bear the banner, and there was again a hard fight. Kerthialfad smote this man too his death blow at once, and so on one after the other all who stood near him. Then Earl Sigurd called on Thorstein the son of Hall of Sida, to bear the banner, and Thorstein was just about to lift the banner, but then Asmund the White said, "Don't bear the banner! For all they who bear it get their death." "Hrafn the Red!" called out Earl Sigurd, "bear thou the banner." "Bear thine own devil thyself," answered Hrafn. Then the earl said, "`Tis fittest that the beggar should bear the bag;'" and with that he took the banner from the staff and put it under his cloak. A little after Asmund the White was slain, and then the earl was pierced through with a spear.

Early 11th century

The army of King Cnut the Great of England, Norway and Denmark bore a raven banner made from white silk at the Battle of Ashingdon in 1016. The Encomium Emmae reports that Cnut had
a banner which gave a wonderful omen. I am well aware that this may seem incredible to the reader, but nevertheless I insert it in my veracious work because it is true: This banner was woven of the cleanest and whitest silk and no picture of any figures was found on it. In case of war, however, a raven was always to be seen, as if it were woven into it. If the Danes were going to win the battle, the raven appeared, beak wide open, flapping its wings and restless on its feet. If they were going to be defeated, the raven did not stir at all, and its limbs hung motionless. 

The Lives of Waltheof and his Father Sivard Digri (The Stout), the Earl of Northumberland, written by a monk of Crowland Abbey (possibly the English historian William of Ramsey), reports that the Danish jarl of Northumbria, Sigurd, was given a banner by an unidentified old sage. The banner was called Ravenlandeye.According to the Heimskringla, Harald Hardrada had a standard called Landøyðan or "Land-waster." This is often assumed to be a raven banner based on the similarity of its name to Sigurd of Northumbria's "Ravenlandeye," though there is no direct evidence connecting Harald's standard with ravens. In a conversation between Harald and King Sweyn II of Denmark,

Sveinn asked Haraldr which of his possessions of his he valued most highly. He answered that it was his banner (merki), Landøyðan. Thereupon Sveinn asked what virtue it had to be accounted so valuable. Haraldr replied that it was prophesied that victory would be his before whom this banner was borne; and added that this had been the case ever since he had obtained it. Thereupon Sveinn said, "I shall believe that your flag has this virtue if you fight three battles with King Magnús, your kinsman, and are victorious in all."
Years later, during Harald's invasion of England, Harald fought a pitched battle against two English earls outside York. Harald's Saga relates that
when King Haraldr saw that the battle array of the English had come down along the ditch right opposite them, he had the trumpets blown and sharply urged his men to the attack, raising his banner called Landøyðan. And there so strong an attack was made by him that nothing held against it.

Harald's army flew the banner at the Battle of Stamford Bridge, where it was carried by a warrior named Frírek. After Harald was struck by an arrow and killed, his army fought fiercely for possession of the banner, and some of them went berserk in their frenzy to secure the flag. In the end the "magic" of the banner failed, and the bulk of the Norwegian army was slaughtered, with only a few escaping to their ships.

Other than the dragon banner of Olaf II of Norway, the Landøyðan of Harald Hardrada is the only early Norwegian royal standard described by Snorri Sturluson in the Heimskringla.

In two panels of the famous Bayeux tapestry, standards are shown which appear to be raven banners. The Bayeux tapestry was commissioned by Bishop Odo, the half-brother of William the Conqueror; as one of the combatants at the Battle of Hastings, Odo would have been familiar with the standards carried into the fight. In one of the panels, depicting a Norman cavalry charge against an English shield-wall, a charging Norman knight is depicted with a semicircular banner emblazoned with a standing black bird. In a second, depicting the deaths of Harold Godwinson's brothers, a triangular banner closely resembling that shown on Olaf Cuaran's coin lies broken on the ground. Scholars are divided as to whether these are simply relics of the Normans' Scandinavian heritage (or for that matter, the Scandinavian influence in Anglo-Saxon England) or whether they reflect an undocumented Norse presence in either the Norman or English army.

Modern reception
Despite claims that the Hrafnsmerki was "the first European flag in the New World", there is no indication that it was ever carried as a universal flag of Scandinavians, and no source assigns it to the Vinland settlers (or any other Icelandic or Greenlandic group).

It is still used by some Danish army regiments, such as the shoulder sleeve insignia on the Guard Hussar Regiment's 1st Battalion 1st Tank Squadron.

The coat of arms of the Norwegian Intelligence Service features two ravens representing Huginn and Muninn, the ravens providing the god Odin with information.

In Shetland an alternative form of the banner (black raven on a rectangular, red field) is used as the symbol of Up Helly Aa, a festival that celebrates the Islands' Norse heritage.

The Eastern Counties RFU adopted the raven as its badge in 1926. It was chosen as representing the heritage of the constituent counties – then Norfolk, Suffolk and Essex; now  Norfolk, Suffolk and Cambridgeshire – as part of the Danelaw.

See also
 Cultural depictions of ravens
 Fairy flag
 Hrafnsmál
 Jagdstaffel 18, which used a black raven insignia
 Uí Ímair
 Valravn

Notes

References
 The Anglo-Saxon Chronicle. (English translation). Everymans Library, 1991.
 Barraclough, Captain E.M.C. "The Raven Flag". Flag Bulletin. Vol. X, No. 2–3. Winchester, MA: The Flag Research Center (FRC), 1969.
 Cappelen, Hans. "Litt heraldikk hos Snorre." Heraldisk tidsskrift No. 51, 1985 p. 34–37. Also printed in Icelandic as "Heimskringla og skjaldarmerkin", Morgunbladir, Reykjavik 3.11.1985
 Dumville, David and Michael Lapidge, eds. The Anglo-Saxon Chronicle, Vol 17: The Annals of St. Neots with Vita Prima Sancti Neoti. Woodbridge: D.S. Brewer. 1985.
 Engene, Jan Oskar. "The Raven Banner and America." NAVA News, Vol. XXIX, No. 5, 1996, pp. 1–2.
 Forte, Angelo, Richard Oram and Frederik Pedersen. Viking Empires. Cambridge: Cambridge University Press, 2005  .
 Grimm, Jakob. Teutonic Mythology. 4 vols. Trans. James Steven Stallybras. New York: Dover, 2004.
 Hjelmquist, Theodor. "Naturskildringarna i den norröna diktningen". In Hildebrand, Hans (ed). Antikvarisk tidskrift för Sverige, Vol 12. Ivar Hæggströms boktryckeri,  Stockholm. 1891.
 Hrafnhildur Bodvarsdottir. The Function of the Beasts of Battle in Old English Poetry. PhD Dissertation, 1976, State University of New York at Stony Brook. Ann Arbor: University Microfilms International. 1989.
 Lukman, N. "The Raven Banner and the Changing Ravens: A Viking Miracle from Carolingian Court Poetry to Saga and Arthurian Romance." Classica et Medievalia 19 (1958): pp. 133–51.
 Njal's Saga. Trans. George DaSent. London, 1861.
 Orkneyinga Saga: The History of the Earls of Orkney. Trans. Pálsson, Hermann and Edwards, Paul (1978). London: Hogarth Press. . Republished 1981, Harmondsworth: Penguin. .
 Poole, R. G. Viking Poems on War and Peace: A Study in Skaldic Narrative. Toronto: University of Toronto Press. 1991.
 Sturluson, Snorri. "King Harald's Saga." Heimskringla. Penguin Classics, 2005.
 Trætteberg, Hallvard.  "Merke og Fløy." Kulturhistorisk leksikon for nordisk middelalder, Vol. XI, Oslo, 1966, columns 549–555.
 Woolf, Rosemary. "The Ideal of Men Dying with their Lord in the Germania and in The Battle of Maldon." Anglo-Saxon England'' Vol. 5, 1976.

External links

 Viking Answer Lady on Viking flags
 Njal's Saga – Public domain edition of translated by George DaSent, 1861, at Northvegr.org
 The Raven Banner

Norse paganism
Germanic archaeological artifacts
Historical flags
Viking art
Viking warfare
Early Germanic symbols
Flags displaying animals

no:Merke (fane)#Ravnefanen